Drillia maculomarginata is a species of sea snail, a marine gastropod mollusc in the family Drilliidae.

Description
The length of the shell of this marine species attains 42 mm.

Distribution
This species occurs off the Aliguay Island, the Philippines.

References

 Kilburn R.N. & Stahlschmidt P. (2012) Description of two new species of Drillia from the Indo-Pacific (Gastropoda: Conoidea: Drilliidae). Archiv für Molluskenkunde 141(1): 51-55 page(s): 52

External links
 

maculomarginata
Gastropods described in 2012